Mao Jiakang (Chinese: 毛嘉康; Pinyin: Máo Jiākāng; born 17 January 1991 in Shanghai) is a Chinese football player who currently plays for  China League One side Nantong Zhiyun as a forward.

Club career
Born in Shanghai, Mao joined Genbao Football Academy in 2000 and was promoted to Shanghai East Asia squad in 2006 for the China League Two campaign. He was described by academy's head master Xu Genbao as being a hot prospect for the future. However, he struggled from lingering injury and faced fierce competition in the forward position and could just make a few appearances for the club. On 19 September 2009, he scored his first goal in the League One, in a 2–1 away victory against Anhui Jiufang. Mao made one appearance in the 2012 season, as Shanghai East Asia won the champions and promoted to the top flight.
In February 2014, Mao moved to China League One side Hunan Billows on a one-year loan deal.

In June 2016, Mao left Shanghai SIPG and transferred to China League Two side Nantong Zhiyun.

Club career statistics 
Statistics accurate as of match played 4 November 2018.

Honours
Shanghai East Asia
 China League One: 2012
 China League Two: 2007

References

1991 births
Living people
Chinese footballers
Footballers from Shanghai
Nantong Zhiyun F.C. players
Hunan Billows players
Shanghai Port F.C. players
Chinese Super League players
China League One players
Association football forwards